Tridrepana subadelpha is a moth in the family Drepanidae. It was described by Song, Xue and Han in 2011. It is found in Yunnan, China.

The length of the forewings is about 13 mm. The forewings are pale yellow with a brown crescent patch under the apex, with a brownish-black ovate spot inside. The antemedial line is greyish brown and punctuate and the postmedial line is brown and punctuate. The discal spot and mid-cell spot are greyish brown, and there is a white strip ringed with brown, as well as two big round greyish-brown patches near the lower angle of the cell, each with a dark brown ovate spot inside. The hindwings have antemedial and postmedial lines that are similar to those on the forewings. There is a small elongate pale greyish-brown patch near the lower angle of the cell and a brown spot inside the patch.

Etymology
The species name refers to the similarity of its genitalia to Tridrepana adelpha and is derived from the Latin prefix sub- and the species name adelpha.

References

Moths described in 2011
Drepaninae